The 1909 season in Swedish football, starting January 1909 and ending December 1909:

Honours

Official titles

Competitions

Promotions, relegations and qualifications

Promotions

Relegations

Domestic results

Stockholmsserien klass 1 1909

Stockholmsserien klass 2 1909

Göteborgsserien klass I 1909

Svenska Mästerskapet 1909 
Final

Corinthian Bowl 1909 
Final

Kamratmästerskapen 1909 
Final

Wicanderska Välgörenhetsskölden 1909 
Final

National team results 

 Sweden:

National team players in season 1909

Notes

References 
Print

Online

 
Seasons in Swedish football
, Swedish